Alixa Naff (September 15, 1919 – June 1, 2013) was a Lebanese-born American historian. She focused much of her research on the first wave of Arab American immigration to the United States at the turn of the 20th century.

Biography
Alixa Naff was born to Faris and Yamna Naff in Rashaya al-Wadi, a village located in present-day Lebanon within the Anti-Lebanon Mountains. Her family immigrated to the United States in 1921. They arrived in Spring Valley, Illinois on  January 1, 1922, and lived there until moving to Fort Wayne, Indiana, in 1929. They moved to Detroit, Michigan in June 1931, where her father worked in the grocery industry. She resided in Falls Church, Virginia, for many years before moving to Mitchellville, Maryland.

Naff documented Arab immigration to the United States during the late 19th and early 20th centuries. This first wave of mostly Christian immigrants was the first major emigration from the Middle East to the U.S. Naff donated her collection of artifacts and oral histories from early Arab immigrants to the Smithsonian Institution in Washington D.C. Naff had driven throughout the nation to collect oral histories and family heirlooms for the collection. She amassed more than 450 oral histories, 2,000 photographs, and more than 500 artifacts. The personal and household objects included kibbe pounder, Middle Eastern musical instruments, and clothing. The Faris and Yamna Naff Collection, which was named in honor of her parents, is available for research through the National Museum of American History.

Alixa Naff died from a short illness at her home in Mitchellville, Maryland, on June 1, 2013, at the age of 93.

References

1919 births
2013 deaths
Lebanese emigrants to the United States
People from Mitchellville, Maryland
People from Falls Church, Virginia
Writers from Detroit
People from Rashaya District
American women historians
20th-century American historians
20th-century American women writers
People from Spring Valley, Illinois
Historians from Illinois
Historians from Michigan
Historians from Virginia
Historians from Maryland
21st-century American women